HiGHS is open-source software to solve linear programming (LP), mixed-integer programming (MIP), and convex quadratic programming (QP) models.

Written in C++ and published under an MIT license, HiGHS provides programming interfaces to C, Python, Julia, Rust, JavaScript, Fortran, and C#. It has no external dependencies.  Aconvenient thin wrapper to Python is available via the  PyPI package.

Although generally single-threaded, some solver components can utilize multi-core architectures. HiGHS is designed to solve large-scale models and exploits problem sparsity. Its performance relative to commercial and other open-source software is reviewed periodically using industry-standard benchmarks.

The term HiGHS may also refer to both the underlying project and the small team leading the software development.

History 

HiGHS is based on solvers written by PhD students from the Optimization and Operational Research Group in the School of Mathematics at the University of Edinburgh. Its origins can be traced back to late 2016, when Ivet Galabova combined her LP presolve with Julian Hall's simplex crash procedure and Huangfu Qi's dual simplex solver to solve a class of industrial LP problems faster than the best open-source solvers at that time. Since then, a C++API and other language interfaces have been developed, and modelling utilities and other categories of solver have been added.

In early2022, the GenX and PyPSA open energy system modelling projects endorsed a funding application for the HiGHS solver in an effort to reduce their community reliance on proprietary libraries.

Solvers

Simplex 

HiGHS has implementations of the primal and dual revised simplex method for solving LP problems, based on techniques described by Hall and McKinnon (2005), and Huangfu and Hall (2015, 2018). These include the exploitation of hyper-sparsity when solving linear systems in the simplex implementations and, for the dual simplex solver, exploitation of multi-threading. The simplex solver's performance relative to commercial and other open-source software is regularly reported using industry-standard benchmarks.

Interior point 

HiGHS has an interior point method implementation for solving LP problems, based on techniques described by Schork and Gondzio (2020). It is notable for solving the Newton system iteratively by a preconditioned conjugate gradient method, rather than directly, via an LDL* decomposition. The interior point solver's performance relative to commercial and other open-source software is regularly reported using industry-standard benchmarks.

Mixed integer programming 

HiGHS has a branch-and-cut solver for MIP problems. Its performance relative to commercial and other open-source software is regularly reported using industry-standard benchmarks.

Quadratic programming 

HiGHS has an active set solver for convex quadratic programming (QP) problems.

Applications using HiGHS 

HiGHS can be used as a standalone solver library in bespoke applications, but numerical computing environments, optimization programming packages, and domainspecific numerical analysis projects are starting to incorporate the software into their systems also.

Numerical computing support 

As powerful opensource software under active development, HiGHS is increasingly being adopted by application software projects that provide support for numerical analysis. The SciPy scientific library, for instance, uses HiGHS as its LP solver from release1.6.0 and the HiGHS MIP solver for discrete optimization from release1.9.0. As well as offering an interface to HiGHS, the JuMP modelling language for Julia also describes the specific use of HiGHS in its user documentation.

Open energy system models 

HiGHS is now also used by some domainspecific applications, including one open energy system modeling environment.  The webbased version of the PyPSA European multisector model deploys the HiGHS solver by default from February 2022.  The GridCal project developing researchoriented power systems software added optional support for HiGHS in February2022.

See also 

 List of optimization software
 Mathematical optimization
 Numerical benchmarking
 Simplex method

External links 

 GitHub repository
 Software documentation

References 

Linear programming

Free and open-source software
Optimization algorithms and methods